The First International Conference on the World-Wide Web (also known as WWW1) was the first-ever conference about the World Wide Web, and the first meeting of what became the International World Wide Web Conference. It was held on May 25 to 27, 1994 in Geneva, Switzerland. The conference had 380 participants, who were accepted out of 800 applicants. It has been referred to as the "Woodstock of the Web".

The event was organized by Robert Cailliau, a computer scientist who had helped to develop the original WWW specification, and was hosted by CERN. Cailliau had lobbied inside CERN, and at conferences like the ACM Hypertext Conference in 1991 (in San Antonio) and 1993 (in Seattle). After returning from the Seattle conference, he announced the new World Wide Web Conference 1. Coincidentally, the NCSA announced their Mosaic and the Web conference 23 hours later.

Content
Dave Raggett showed his testbed web browser Arena and gave a summary of his first HTML+ Internet Draft. He also submitted a paper for VRML.

The Biological Sciences Division of the University of Chicago presented a web browser and HTML editor called Phoenix built upon tkWWW version 0.9. The editor extended the functionality of tkWWW.

Best of the Web Awards
The Best of the Web Awards were given out on May 26 following the "Best of WWW" contest set up by Brandon Plewe. The awards were selected via a two-month open nomination, and a two-week open voting period. A total of 5,225 votes were cast, with the winners averaging 100 votes.

Best of the Web '94 Recipients

Best Overall Site
Winner
 National Center for Supercomputing Applications, U. Illinois, Urbana-Champaign

Honorable Mentions
 World-Wide Web Home, European Center for Particle Physics (CERN)
 CMU Computer Science Dept., Carnegie-Mellon U.
 Global Network Navigator, O'Reilly and Associates

Other Nominees
 SunSITE, U. North Carolina
 United States Geological Survey

Best Campus-Wide Information Service
Winner
 Globewide Network Academy

Honorable Mentions
 Rensselaer Polytechnic Institute - RPINFO
 St. Olaf College
 University of Kansas - KUFacts
 University of Texas - Austin

Other Nominees
 Honolulu Community College
 State University of New York at Buffalo
 University of Maryland - Baltimore County
 Wake Forest University - Deacons Online

Best Commercial Service
Winner
 O'Reilly and Associates

Honorable Mention
 Hewlett-Packard
 Novell, Inc.
 Sun Microsystems, Inc.

Other Nominees
 Arctic Adventours, Inc.
 Digital Equipment Corp.
 The Mathworks Inc
 Nine Lives Consignment Clothing Store
 QMS
 Quadralay
 Santa Cruz Operation

Best Educational Service
Winner
 Introduction to Object-Oriented Programming Using C++ - Marcus Speh

Honorable Mention
 ArtServe - Australian National University
 Expo - Frans van Hoesel (housed at UNC SunSITE)
 Museum of Paleontology - University of California at Berkeley
 Views of the Solar System - C.J. Hamilton, Los Alamos National Laboratory

Other Nominees
 Early Scientific Instruments - Department of Physical Sciences, University of Naples "Federico II"
 Geographic Information Systems - U.S. Geological Survey
 Geometry Applications Gallery - U. Minnesota Geometry Center
 The Journey North - U. Michigan School of Education
 A Tourist Expedition to Antarctica - L. Liming, U. Michigan

Best Entertainment Service
Winner
 Sports Information Service, Eric Richard, MIT

Honorable Mention
 Movie Database (Original in UK, or Mirror in US) - Rob Hartill, U. Wales-Cardiff
 Doctor Fun - Dave Farley, U. Chicago
 MTV - Adam Curry, MTV Networks

Other Nominees
 The Global Network Navigator - O'Reilly and Associates
 Music Database - Andy Burnett, U.S. Army CERL
 TNS Technology Demonstrations - MIT Telemedia, Networks, and Systems Group
 Wired Magazine

Best Professional Service
Winner
 OncoLink, U. Pennsylvania

Honorable Mention
 BioInformatics Server - Johns Hopkins U.
 Explorer - U. Kansas UNITE Group
 Unified CS Technical Report Index - Marc VanHeyningen, Indiana U.
 Climate Data Catalog - Columbia U.

Other Nominees
 Genome Data Base
 HEASARC Browse - NASA Goddard Space Flight Center
 SWISS-PROT Protein Sequence Database - Geneva U. Hospital
 Physics E-Print Archives - Paul Ginsparg, Los Alamos National Laboratory
 Virtual Hospital - U. Iowa

Best Navigational Aid
Winner
 World-Wide Web Worm, Oliver McBryan, U. Colorado CS

Honorable Mention
 Internet Meta-Index - Oscar Nierstrasz, U. Geneva Informatics
 Project DA-CLOD - Sam Sengupta, Washington U.-St. Louis
 Galaxy - EINet

Other Nominees
 AliWeb - Martijn Koster, Nexor
 JumpStation - Jonathan Fletcher, Stirling U.
 W3 Catalog - Oscar Nierstrasz, U. Geneva Informatics
 Joel's Hierarchical Subject Index - Joel Jones, U. Illinois, Urbana-Champaign
 Mother-of-all-BBS' - Oliver McBryan, U. Colorado CS
 The Virtual Tourist - Brandon Plewe, SUNY/Buffalo

Most Important Service Concept
Winner
 What's New on the WWW, Marc Andreessen, NCSA, June 1993

Honorable Mention
 Web Magazines: The Global Network Navigator - O'Reilly and Associates
 Distance Learning: The Globewide Network Academy
 Virtual Museums: Honolulu C.C. Dinosaur Exhibit - Kevin Hughes

Other Nominees
 Interactive Graphics: Honolulu C.C. Campus Map - Kevin Hughes
 Web Space for Rent: Internex Information Services
 Online Encyclopedia: The Interpedia
 File converters, Text Databases: Usenet FAQ Archives - Tom Fine, Ohio State U.
 Customized Server Software: Map Server - Steve Putz, Xerox PARC

Best Document Design
Winner
 Travels With Samantha, Phillip Greenspun, MIT

Honorable Mention
 Principia Cybernetica Web - Francis Heylighen et al., Free U. of Brussels
 Telektronikk - Håkon Lie, Norwegian Telecom
 Wired Magazine

Other Nominees
 Ada 9X Reference Manual - Magnus Kempe, Swiss Federal Inst. Tech.- Lausanne
 GNN NetNews - O'Reilly and Associates
 HTML Style Guide - Tim Berners-Lee, CERN
 Manual of Federal Geographic Data Products - William G. Miller, U.S. Geological Survey
 Perl Manual - Robert Stockton, Carnegie-Mellon U.
 U.S. Constitution - Legal Information Institute, Cornell U.

Best Use of Interaction
Winner
 Xerox Map Server, Steve Putz, Xerox PARC

Honorable Mention
 DA-CLOD - Sam Sengupta, Washington U.-St. Louis
 Geometry Applications Gallery - U. Minnesota Geometry Center
 Weather Map requestor - Charles Henrich, Michigan State U.

Other Nominees
 16 Puzzle - Andrew Wilson, U. Cardiff-Wales
 Swiss 2D-Page - Geneva U. Hospital ExPASy
 SkyView Gateway - NASA Goddard Space Flight Center HEASARC
 You Are Here Server - Brandon Plewe, SUNY/Buffalo

Best Use of Multiple Media
Winner
 Le Louvre, Nicolas Pioch, Telecom Paris

Honorable Mention
 ArtServe - Australian National University
 Coherent Structure in Turbulent Fluid Flow - Nat. Ctr for Atmospheric Research
 Expo - Frans van Hoesel
 TNS Technology Demos - MIT Telemedia Networks and Systems Group

Other Nominees
 Een Kwestie van Kiezen (A Matter of Choice) - U. Wageningen, Netherlands
 Museum of Paleontology - U. California - Berkeley
 Recording Studio - Adam Curry, MTV
 Texas History Exhibits - U. Texas-Austin Library
 Usenet Image Gallery - Stéphane Bortzmeyer, CNAM, France
 XMorphia - Roy Williams, Caltech

Most Technical Merit
Winner
 Map Server, Steve Putz, Xerox PARC

Honorable Mention
 Dutch Teletext Gateway - Arjan de Vet, Eindhoven University
 Gallery of Interactive On-Line Geometry - UMN Geometry Center
 Interactive Genetic Art - Scott Reilly and Michael Witbrock, Carnegie-Mellon U.

Other Nominees
 Mother-of-all-BBS' - Oliver McBryan, U. Colorado CS
 Monthly Temperature Anomalies - NOAA National Climatic Data Center
 Temperature Display - Oliver McBryan, U. Colorado CS
 GRN UseNet Article Decoder - George Phillips, U. British Columbia
 Say... - Axel Belinfante, U. Twente, Netherlands
 SkyView - NASA Goddard Space Flight Center

World Wide Web Hall of Fame Inductees
The following people were inducted into the World Wide Web Hall of Fame for their contributions and influence. The inductees received a Chromachron watch, engraved with the WWW logo.
 Tim Berners-Lee, CERN
 Marc Andreessen, Netscape Communications Co., formerly at NCSA
 Eric Bina, Netscape Communications Co., formerly at NCSA
 Kevin Hughes, InMobi, formerly at Honolulu C.C.
 Rob Hartill, Los Alamos National Lab, formerly at U. Wales College at Cardiff
 Lou Montulli, Netscape Communications Co., formerly at U. Kansas

References

External links
 
 Trip Reports
 www94 Report by Henry Rzepa, Imperial College, Trip Report
 www94 Report by Peter Robinson, then University of Oxford, Trip Report
 Live From WWW '94 at CERN
 Best of the Web '94 Recipients
 Plenary at WWW Geneva 94 - some slides of Tim Berners-Lees presentation

Historical events in Switzerland
First International
First International
CERN
1994 conferences
May 1994 events in Europe